Thornetsi was a family that ruled the region of Djahan in Armenia. Its main ruler was Sempat Thor'netsi  975.

References

Princes of Armenia